The Sea  is a 2000 Spanish film directed by Agustí Villaronga, starring Roger Casamayor. It is based on a novel by Blai Bonet. The plot, set in Mallorca, follows the fates of three childhood friends traumatized by the violence they witnessed during the Spanish Civil War. Ten years later, they are reunited as young adults in a sanatorium for TB patients. The film won the Manfred Salzgeber Award at the Berlin International Film Festival.

Plot
In the summer of 1936, the violence of the Spanish Civil war reaches a small village in Mallorca. Four children: Andreu Ramallo, Manuel Tur, Pau Inglada and a girl, Francisca, are witness to the execution of leftists at the hands of pro-Franco villagers. In a desperate act of revenge, Pau, whose father has been killed the previous day by the lead executioner, plans to avenge his father's murder torturing Julià Ballester, the son of his father's killer. His idea is to force the boy to drink castor oil. However, things go wrong when the boy, Julià Ballester, taunts them and Pau becomes enraged. He brutally kills Julià by bashing his head against a rock and then stabbing him in the throat. Unable to deal with what he has just done, Pau commits suicide jumping inside a hole on a cave. The remaining children: Andreu, Manuel, and Francisa are witnesses to these tragic events.

Over a decade later, Ramallo, now a cocky young man, is sent to a tuberculosis sanatorium on Mallorca to recuperate from the initial stages of the disease. Ramallo, like all the tubercular and lung diseased patients, has to live in a large room, dormitory style. However, as a patient's health dwindles and they are expected to die, they are sent to a private room numbered 13 for their final days. Ramallo with his boastfulness and stories of sexual prowess attracts the admiration of the other patients, particularly from Galindo, the youngest of the group.

Ramallo is shocked to find that Manuel Tur, his childhood friend, is also a patient. A pale and drawn man, Manuel has found solace to his health predicament in religion. Even more shocking is the sight of the beautiful Francisca, now a selfless nun, nursing the sick at the hospital. Alcantara, the brutal caretaker and Carmen, his unhappy wife, run the place. Shortly after his arrival, Ramallo receives the unwanted visit of Don Eugeni Morell, his former boss, in smuggling contraband. The well-to-do middle age Morel, has also sexually exploited him for long time. Morell's visit makes Ramallo furious and from then on, he tries to disassociate himself from the crime lord. As a reminder than he can count only on himself, Ramallo gets his own name tattooed on his chest by Alcántara, the hospital's maintenance guy. In the clinic, Manuel has a pet cat that he dotes on. In a fit of anger Ramallo kicks the cat almost to death. Manuel gives the dying animal back to Ramallo to put it out of its misery. They bury the animal together and reconcile remembering their childhood friendship.

Ramallo wants to get rid of Morell for good, but his first attempt to steal some money from the church of the sanatorium fails when he is discovered by Francisca. As a child, Francisca had a crush on Ramallo and now she is glad to see him again, but she assures him that she is perfectly happy in her life as a nun. Ramallo starts scheming to hijack smuggling goods from Morell. He recruits Manuel in helping him to steal the keys of Alcántara's car in order to go to the nearby port. In the middle of this dealing, Galindo's death affects Ramallo deeply. Carmen has a soft spot for Manuel and seduces him. At first, Manuel tries to resist the temptation because she is a married woman, but she assures him that she is unhappy in her marriage and only feels disgust for her husband. They have sex, but when Manuel finds out that she came to visit him on Ramallo's suggestion, he tells her to leave him alone. Manuel angrily confronts Ramallo accusing him of being jealous of his purity. Ramallo leaves him silent telling him that his anger comes because he is secretly in love with him. In fact, attracted to his friend, Manuel steals Ramallo's clothes but, in his morbid religious fervor, fights his desires that he believes are diabolical. Manuel's sexual panic turns into self-inflicted stigmata.

Francisca accidentally discovers Ramallo's schemes but does not turn him in, instead she travels with Manuel to the cave in which Pau committed suicide in order to recover from it the items Ramallo stole from Morell. Ramallo escapes the sanatorium and returns to Morell's home. When Morell tells him that Manuel betrayed him, giving away the location of his purloined goods, Ramallo murders Morell with an axe. Ramallo returns to the sanatorium to take revenge on Manuel. Manuel tells Ramallo that he loves him and that he gave the goods to Morell to fight his attraction for him. Ramallo begins to rape him, claiming that the pleasure will get Manuel torture for the rest of his life. Manuel plunges a knife into Ramallo's throat before slitting his own wrist. Francisca lays out the two bodies in the mortuary and removes her nun's coif.

Cast
Roger Casamajor - Ramallo
Bruno Bergonzini - Manuel
 Antònia Torrens - Sister Francisca
 Hernán González - Galindo
 Juli Mira - Don Eugeni Morell
Simón Andreu - Alcántara
Ángela Molina - Carmen
David Lozano - Manuel Tur
Nilo Mur - Andreu Ramallo
Tony Miquel Vanrell - Paul Inglada
Victoria Verger - Francisca
Sergi Moreno - Julià Ballester

DVD release
El mar  is available on DVD. It was released in the United States on December 14, 2004, in Catalan with English and Spanish subtitles available.

External links
 
 
 

2000 films
2000s political drama films
2000 LGBT-related films
Films about animal cruelty
2000s business films
Catalan films
2000s Catalan-language films
Films about capital punishment
Films about Catholic nuns
Films about cats
Films about child abuse
Films about death
Films about disability
Films about infectious diseases
Films about rape
Films about suicide
Films directed by Agustí Villaronga
Films scored by Javier Navarrete
Films set in 1936
Films set in the Balearic Islands
Films shot in Mallorca
Films set in hospitals
LGBT-related drama films
Spanish drama films
Spanish independent films
Spanish LGBT-related films
2000 drama films
2000s Spanish films